Liz Lachman is an American writer, director, and composer. She has worked on such award-winning short films as Getting to Know You, Pandora's Box, and Puppy Love. Born in Detroit, she currently lives in Los Angeles. Her partner is the chef Susan Feniger.

Credits

Writing
Getting to Know You (2005)
Dante's Cove (2005)

Directing
Getting to Know You (2005)

Music
A Flintstone Family Christmas (1993)
Puppy Love (2000)
Damned River (1990)
Lucky Day (1991)
In the Arms of a Killer (1992)
Gunmen (1994)
The Glass Shield (1994)
Capitol Critters (1995)
The Babysitter (1995)
Nightjohn (1996)
The Wedding (1998)

Awards and nominations
Golden Reel Awards:

Nominated, 2000, Best Sound Editing - Television Animation - Music for: "Timon & Pumbaa" (episode "Steel Hog/Dealers Cut Choice") (shared with Brian F. Mars)
Nominated, 2000, Best Sound Editing - Television Animation - Music for: "Timon & Pumbaa" (episode "Hot Air Buffoons") (shared with Fil Brown)
Nominated, 2000, Best Sound Editing - Television Animation - Music for: "Mickey Mouse Works" (shared with William Griggs and Jason Oliver)
Nominated, 2001, Best Sound Editing - Television Animation - Music for: "Pepper Ann" (shared with Nick Carr)
Won, 2001, Best Sound Editing - Television Animation - Music for: "Mickey Mouse Works" (shared with Jason Oliver)
Nominated, 2002, Best Sound Editing in Television - Music, Episodic Animation for: "House of Mouse" (shared with Jason Oliver)

Daytime Emmy awards:

Won, 1988, Outstanding Achievement in Music Direction and Composition for a Drama Series for: "Santa Barbara" (shared with Dominic Messinger and Rick Rhodes)

References

External links

Mini-biography and brief interview with Liz Lachman

Living people
American women writers
American women composers
21st-century American composers
Daytime Emmy Award winners
Musicians from Detroit
Year of birth missing (living people)
American LGBT musicians
American LGBT writers
21st-century American women musicians
21st-century women composers